Irandegan District is a district (bakhsh) in Khash County, Sistan and Baluchestan province, Iran. At the 2006 census, its population was 12,432, in 2,872 families. At the 2016 census, its population was 13,323. The district has one city: Deh-e Rais. The district has two rural districts (dehestan): Irandegan Rural District and Kahnuk Rural District.

References 

Khash County
Districts of Sistan and Baluchestan Province
Populated places in Khash County